Kenneth Saggers (4 July 1936 – 31 January 2014) was a South African cricketer. He played first-class cricket for Griqualand West, Northerns and Orange Free State between 1958 and 1971.

References

External links
 

1936 births
2014 deaths
South African cricketers
Griqualand West cricketers
Northerns cricketers
Free State cricketers
Cricketers from Pretoria